A midden (also kitchen midden or shell heap) is an old dump for domestic waste which may consist of  animal bone, human excrement, botanical material, mollusc shells, potsherds, lithics (especially debitage), and other artifacts and ecofacts associated with past human occupation.

These features provide a useful resource for archaeologists who wish to study the diets and habits of past societies. Middens with damp, anaerobic conditions can even preserve organic remains in deposits as the debris of daily life are tossed on the pile. Each individual toss will contribute a different mix of materials depending upon the activity associated with that particular toss. During the course of deposition sedimentary material is deposited as well. Different mechanisms, from wind and water to animal digs, create a matrix which can also be analysed to provide seasonal and climatic information. In some middens individual dumps of material can be discerned and analysed.

Shells

A shell midden or shell mound is an archaeological feature consisting mainly of mollusk shells. The Danish term køkkenmøddinger (plural) was first used by Japetus Steenstrup to describe shell heaps and continues to be used by some researchers. A midden, by definition, contains the debris of human activity, and should not be confused with wind- or tide-created beach mounds. Some shell middens are processing remains: areas where aquatic resources were processed directly after harvest and prior to use or storage in a distant location.

Some shell middens are directly associated with villages, as a designated village dump site. In other middens, the material is directly associated with a house in the village. Each household would dump its garbage directly outside the house. In all cases, shell middens are extremely complex and very difficult to excavate fully and exactly. The fact that they contain a detailed record of what food was eaten or processed and many fragments of stone tools and household goods makes them invaluable objects of archaeological study.

Shells have a high calcium carbonate content, which tends to make the middens alkaline. This slows the normal rate of decay caused by soil acidity, leaving a relatively high proportion of organic material (food remnants, organic tools, clothing, human remains) available for archaeologists to find.

Edward Sylvester Morse conducted one of the first archaeological excavations of the Omori Shell Mounds in Tokyo, Japan in 1877, which led to the discovery of a style of pottery described as "cord-marked", translated as "Jōmon", which came to be used to refer to the early period of Japanese history when this style of pottery was produced. Shell middens were studied in Denmark in the latter half of the 19th century. The Danish word køkkenmødding (kitchen mound) is now used internationally. The English word "midden" (waste mound) derives from the same Old Norse word that produced the modern Danish one.

Examples

Shell middens are found in coastal or lakeshore zones all over the world. Consisting mostly of mollusc shells, they are interpreted as being the waste products of meals eaten by nomadic groups or hunting parties. Some are small examples relating to meals had by a handful of individuals, others are many metres in length and width and represent centuries of shell deposition. In Brazil, they are known as sambaquis, having been created over a long period between the 6th millennium BCE and the beginning of European colonisation.

European shell middens are primarily found along the Atlantic seaboard and in Denmark and primarily date to the 5th millennium BCE (Ertebølle and Early Funnel Beaker cultures), containing the remains of the earliest Neolithisation process (pottery, cereals and domestic animals). Younger shell middens are found in Latvia (associated with Comb Ware ceramics), Sweden (associated with Pitted Ware ceramics), the Netherlands (associated with Corded Ware ceramics) and Schleswig-Holstein (Late Neolithic and Iron Age). All these are examples where communities practised a mixed farming and hunting/gathering economy.

On Canada's west coast, there are shell middens that run for more than  along the coast and are several meters deep.

Shell middens created in coastal regions of Australia by Indigenous Australians exist in Australia today. Middens provide evidence of prior occupation and are generally protected from mining and other developments. One must exercise caution in deciding whether one is examining a midden or a beach mound. There are good examples on the Freycinet Peninsula in Tasmania where wave action currently is combining charcoal from forest fire debris with a mix of shells into masses that storms deposit above high-water mark. Some shell middens are regarded as sacred sites, linked to the Dreamtime, such as those of the Anbarra group of the Burarra people of Arnhem Land.

Shell mounds are also credited with the creation of tropical hardwood hammocks, one example being the Otter Mound Preserve in Florida, where shell deposits from Calusa natives provided flood free high areas in otherwise large watered areas.

There are instances in which shell middens may have doubled as areas of ceremonial construction or ritual significance. The Woodland period Crystal River site provides an example of this phenomenon.

Some shell mounds, known as shell rings, are circular or open arcs with a clear central area. Many are known from Japan and the southeastern United States, and at least one from South America.

Etymology and usage

The word is of Scandinavian via Middle English derivation (from early Scandinavian; Danish: mødding, Swedish regional: mödding). 

The word "midden" is still in everyday use in Scotland and has come by extension to refer to anything that is a mess, a muddle, or chaos.

The word is used by farmers in Britain to describe the place where farm yard manure from cows or other animals is collected. Grants are sometimes available to protect these from rain to  avoid runoff and pollution.

In the animal kingdom, some species establish ground burrows, also known as middens, that are used mostly for food storage. For example, the North American red squirrel (Tamiasciurus hudsonicus) usually has one large active midden in each territory with perhaps an inactive or auxiliary midden. A midden may be a regularly used animal toilet area or dunghill, created by many mammals, such as the hyrax, and also serving as a territorial marker.

Octopus middens are piles of debris that the octopus piles up to conceal the entrance of its den. Octopus middens are commonly made of rocks, shells, and the bones of prey, although they may contain anything the octopus finds that it can move.

See also

 Asturian culture, characterized by shell-middens
 Crystal River Archaeological State Park
 Emeryville Shellmound
 Green Mound
 Landfill
 Mussel Point, a megamidden in the South African West Coast
 Packrat midden
 Privy midden
Tell
 Tumulus
 Urban archaeology
 Waste management in Australia#Pre-European settlement
 West Berkeley Shellmound
 Whaleback Shell Midden
 Yachats, Oregon

References

External links

 

Shell middens
Landfill
Stone Age